Kevin Ablett (born 26 March 1958) is a former Australian rules footballer who played with Hawthorn, Richmond and Geelong in the Victorian Football League (VFL).

Sources
Holmesby, Russell & Main, Jim (2009). The Encyclopedia of AFL Footballers. 8th ed. Melbourne: Bas Publishing.

Kevin
Australian rules footballers from Victoria (Australia)
Hawthorn Football Club players
Richmond Football Club players
Geelong Football Club players
Living people
1958 births